Sehnal (Czech feminine: Sehnalová) is a surname. It may refer to:

 Ladislav Sehnal (born 1931), Czech astronomer
 Olga Sehnalová (born 1968), Czech politician
 Ondřej Sehnal (born 1997), Czech basketball player

See also
 

Czech-language surnames